Crassispira ritanida is an extinct species of sea snail, a marine gastropod mollusk in the family Pseudomelatomidae, the turrids and allies.

Description
The length of the shell attains 8.5 mm, its diameter 4 mm.

Distribution
Fossils have been found in  Pliocene strata in Trinidad and Tobago; age range: 5.332 to 3.6 Ma.

References

 W. C. Mansfield. 1925. Miocene gastropods and scaphopods from Trinidad, British West Indies. Proceedings of the United States National Museum 66(22):9116-9125

External links
 Worldwide Mollusc Species Data Base: Crassispira ritanida

ritanida
Gastropods described in 1925